Dr. Rainer Opitz (1954 – February 7, 2019) — was a German businessman, numismatist, and author of numismatic catalogue "Reformatio in Nummis".

Life and career
Rainer Opitz was born in Sebnitz, Germany. In 1981 he enrolled at Humboldt University in Berlin where he studied philosophy. After graduation from the university in 1985, from 1987 to 1990 Opitz pursued doctoral degree in the historic relationship between religion and the military.

After reunification of Germany Opitz took a job at commercial company in Bielefeld, where he worked until his resignation in 2001. He then founded his own company Promota GmbH, whose business success played a critical role in helping to assemble one of the largest collections of coins and medals dedicated to the history of the Reformation.

References

1954 births
2019 deaths
People from Sebnitz
National People's Army personnel
German numismatists
Humboldt University of Berlin alumni